The 2002–03 FA Premier League (known as the FA Barclaycard Premiership for sponsorship reasons) was the 11th season of the Premier League, the top division in English football. The first matches were played on 17 August 2002 and the last were played on 11 May 2003.

Manchester United ended the campaign as champions for the eighth time in eleven years – an achievement made all the more remarkable by the fact that defending champions Arsenal had been in the lead by eight points on 2 March. After defeating Birmingham at the start of the season, Arsenal equalled a top-flight record of fourteen straight wins but failed to extend it in their next game at West Ham United, being held to a 2–2 draw. They remained unbeaten for 30 Premier League games, 23 of which were played away, until late October, and scored in a record 55 consecutive league games, beating the previous record of 47 set by Chesterfield during the 1930-31 Third Division North season. This run ended at Old Trafford on 7 December 2002, when Manchester United won 2–0. Arsenal then threw away a priceless lead against Bolton Wanderers and finally surrendered the title with a 3–2 home defeat to Leeds United in their antepenultimate game of the season, a result that also saved Leeds from relegation. Newcastle United and Chelsea were the remaining Champions League qualifiers, at the expense of Liverpool who had to settle for the UEFA Cup; they would be joined in Europe by Blackburn Rovers for a second successive season, along with Southampton who were back in Europe for the first time since 1984.

At the bottom end of the table, West Ham United, West Bromwich Albion and Sunderland were relegated to the Football League First Division; West Ham's 42 points from a 38-game season was a record for a relegated team. Promoted to replace them were 2002–03 Football League First Division champions Portsmouth, runners-up Leicester City, and play-off winner Wolverhampton Wanderers.

Teams
Twenty teams competed in the league – the top seventeen teams from the previous season and the three teams promoted from the First Division. The promoted teams were Manchester City (immediately returning after a season's absence), West Bromwich Albion, and Birmingham City (both teams returning to the top flight after a sixteen-year absence). This was also both West Bromwich Albion and Birmingham City's first season in the Premier League. They replaced Ipswich Town (relegated after two seasons in the top flight), Derby County, and Leicester City (both teams relegated after a six-year presence).

Stadiums and locations

Personnel and kits

Managerial changes

League table

Results

Overall
Most wins – Manchester United (25)
Fewest wins – Sunderland (4)
Most draws – Bolton Wanderers (14)
Fewest draws – Leeds United (5)
Most losses – Sunderland (27)
Fewest losses – Manchester United (5)
Most goals scored – Arsenal (85)
Fewest goals scored – Sunderland (21)
Most goals conceded – West Bromwich Albion and Sunderland (65)
Fewest goals conceded – Manchester United (34)

Season statistics

Top scorers

Hat-tricks

 4 Player scored 4 goals

Scoring
First goal of the season: Michael Ricketts for Bolton Wanderers against Fulham (17 August 2002)
Fastest goal of the season:
Largest winning margin: 6 goals
West Bromwich Albion 0–6 Liverpool (26 April 2003)
Highest scoring game: 8 goals
Manchester United 5–3 Newcastle United (23 November 2002)
Newcastle United 2–6 Manchester United (12 April 2003)
Most goals scored in a match by a losing team: 3 goals
West Ham United 3–4 Leeds United (10 November 2002)
Manchester United 5–3 Newcastle United (23 November 2002)
Bolton Wanderers 4–3 Newcastle United (26 December 2002)
Tottenham Hotspur 4–3 Everton (12 January 2003)

Clean sheets
Most clean sheets: 15
Blackburn Rovers
Fewest clean sheets: 5
Tottenham Hotspur

Discipline
Worst overall disciplinary record (1 pt per yellow card, 3 pts per red card):

Best overall disciplinary record:

Most yellow cards (club):
Most yellow cards (player): 13 – Iván Campo (Bolton Wanderers)
Most red cards (club):
Most red card (player): 3
Franck Queudrue (Middlesbrough)
Most fouls (player):

Awards

Monthly awards

Annual awards

PFA Players' Player of the Year
The PFA Players' Player of the Year award for 2003 was won by Thierry Henry of Arsenal. This was the Frenchman's first award of the season and he beat off competition from the previous winner Ruud van Nistelrooy.

The shortlist for the PFA Players' Player of the Year award, in alphabetical order, was as follows:

PFA Young Player of the Year
The PFA Young Player of the Year award was won by Jermaine Jenas of Newcastle United. Wayne Rooney was voted runner-up, and John O'Shea finished third in one of his first full seasons as a United player.

The shortlist for the award was as follows:

PFA Team of the Year

Premier League Manager of the Year
The Premier League Manager of the Year award was won by Sir Alex Ferguson for winning his eighth title and regaining the league after a superb second half to the season, involving an 18-match unbeaten run.

Premier League Player of the Year
The Premier League Player of the Year award was given to Ruud van Nistelrooy, whose form, creativity and goals all helped Manchester United regain the league from Arsenal.

Premier League Golden Boot
The Premier League Golden Boot award was also won by Ruud van Nistelrooy who scored 25 goals in 38 league matches and 44 in all competitions. He also equalled his record of eight goals in eight successive matches at the beginning of the season, a milestone he had reached the previous season. Van Nistelrooy finished one goal ahead of Arsenal's Thierry Henry while James Beattie managed 23 league goals for Southampton.

Premier League Golden Gloves
The Premier League Golden Gloves award was given to Chelsea goalkeeper Carlo Cudicini, who proved vital in their quest for UEFA Champions League football. He kept twelve clean sheets – the most in the season – and only conceded 35 goals. Viewers of ITV's On the Ball voted Cudicini, ahead of Southampton keeper Antti Niemi, and Blackburn Rovers' Brad Friedel.

Goal of the Season
The annual award was won by a wonder goal from Thierry Henry against Tottenham Hotspur, on 16 November 2002, voted by viewers of ITV's The Premiership.

The French striker picked up the ball from his side of the pitch and ran almost , twisting and turning the Spurs defence to unleash a thunderous shot. In celebration, he ran the distance of the whole pitch and skidded in front of the Spurs faithful. The goal proved important as it helped them regain their position at the top of the Premiership from Liverpool.

Premier League Fair Play Award
The Premier League Fair Play Award was won by Manchester United.

See also
2002–03 in English football
2003–04 FA Premier League

References

External links
 2002–03 Premier League Season at RSSSF
 2002–03 FA Premier League Review
 Soccerbot's 2002–03 Premier League Review
 Barclaycard Premiership club-by-club Season Review

 
Premier League seasons
Eng
1